Marie of Ponthieu (17 April 1199 – 21 September 1250) was suo jure Countess of Ponthieu and Countess of Montreuil, ruling from 1221 to 1250.

Biography
Marie was the daughter of William IV of Ponthieu and Alys, Countess of the Vexin, and granddaughter of King Louis VII of France by his second wife Constance of Castile. As her father's only surviving child, Marie succeeded him, ruling as Countess of Ponthieu and Montreuil from 1221 to 1250.

Marriages and children
She married Simon of Dammartin before September 1208. He was the son of Alberic II of Dammartin and Maud de Clermont, daughter of Renaud de Clermont, Count de Clermont-en-Beauvaisis. Simon and Marie had four daughters but only two are recorded. Their elder daughter was Joan of Dammartin (1220- 16 March 1279), second wife of Ferdinand III of Castile. Their younger daughter was Philippe of Dammartin (died 1277/81) who married firstly Raoul II d' Issoudun, secondly Raoul II de Coucy, and thirdly Otto II, Count Geldern.

Marie secondly married at some time between September 1240 and 15 December 1241, Mathieu de Montmorency, Seigneur d'Attichy, who was killed in battle at Mansurrah on 8 February 1250 during the Seventh Crusade, led by King Louis IX of France.

References

Sources

1199 births
1250 deaths
Counts of Ponthieu
Ponthieu, Countess of, Marie
House of Montmorency
House of Dammartin
13th-century women rulers
12th-century French women
12th-century French people
13th-century French women
13th-century French people